Basilio Gradi, O.S.B. (died 1585) was a Roman Catholic prelate who served as Bishop of Ston (1584–1585).

Biography
Basilio Gradi was ordained a priest in the Order of Saint Benedict. On 14 March 1584, he was appointed by Pope Gregory XIII as Bishop of Ston. On 6 May 1584, he was consecrated bishop by Thomas Goldwell, Bishop of Saint Asaph with Giovanni Battista Santorio, Bishop of Alife, and Ignazio Danti, Bishop of Alatri, as co-consecrators. He served as Bishop of Ston until his death in 1585.

References 

1585 deaths
16th-century Roman Catholic bishops in Croatia
Bishops appointed by Pope Gregory XIII